Grays (or Grays Thurrock) is the largest town in the borough and unitary authority of Thurrock in Essex, England. The town which is both a former civil parish and one of Thurrock's traditional Church of England parishes is located on the north bank of the River Thames. 

Its economy is linked to Port of London industries, its own offices, retail and the Lakeside Shopping Centre at West Thurrock. In 1931 the parish had a population of 18,173.

History
Samuel Pepys recorded in his diary that he visited Grays on 24 September 1665 and apparently bought fish from the local fishermen. Parts of Grays and Chafford Hundred are set within three Victorian chalk pits; the largest two being the Lion Gorge, and the Warren Gorge. Another area of the Chafford Hundred residential development is built on a Victorian landfill site. The civic offices on New Road in Grays were built in the 1980s; work on an extension began in January 2020.

On 1 April 1936 the parish was abolished to form Thurrock.

On 23 October 2019, the bodies of 39 people were found in the back of a lorry at Waterglade Industrial Park in Eastern Avenue. They are believed to have been victims of human trafficking, or migrants being smuggled into Britain. The vehicle, registered in Bulgaria, was thought to have travelled to the UK through Purfleet from Zeebrugge. A 25-year-old lorry driver from Northern Ireland was arrested by Essex Police on suspicion of murder and pleaded guilty to manslaughter in April 2020. Essex Police launched an investigation afterwards and the lorry was moved to the nearby Port of Tilbury. It is the biggest murder investigation in the history of Essex police. On 26 May 2020, a total of 26 further suspects, most of whom Vietnamese nationals, were arrested in Belgium and France.

Origin of the name
The origin of the name "Grays Thurrock" comes in two parts. Thurrock is a Saxon name meaning "the bottom of a ship". The element "Grays" comes from Henry de Grai, a descendant of the Norman knight Anchetil de Greye, who was granted the manor of Grays Thurrock in 1195 by Richard I.

Geography 

Grays contains the wards and residential areas of Grays Riverside, Grays Thurrock, Stifford Clays, Little Thurrock Blackshots, Little Thurrock Rectory and Chadwell St Mary. Parts of Chafford Hundred and North and South Stifford are also in Grays.

The nearest places to Grays are:

 Aveley
 Brentwood
 Chadwell St Mary
 Chafford Hundred
 East Tilbury
 North Stifford
 Orsett
Orsett Heath
 Purfleet-on-Thames
 South Ockendon
 South Stifford
 Tilbury
 West Thurrock
 Basildon

Landmarks

Local sites of interest include the Thameside Theatre, the Thurrock History Museum, Grays Beach, The White Hart, and the former State Cinema.

The Dell was of the earliest houses in Britain to be built of concrete. It was built on the instructions of Alfred Russel Wallace, who lived in the town from 1872 until 1876.

From the top of the Derby Road Bridge in Grays one can look down to Thurrock Yacht Club, Grays Beach children's playground and the River Thames.

As well as Thurrock Yacht Club, Grays Beach is the site of the local landmark The Gull, a lightship built in 1860, which has lain on the foreshore for decades and is now in a serious state of dilapidation. The light from The Gull has now been removed, restored and installed on the foreshore of the yacht club.

The Thameside Theatre was built in 1971 and is the only theatre in Thurrock. In July 2021 Thurrock Council declared it to be surplus to budget requirements and announced plans for its closure. The Labour opposition in the council opposed the plans and an online petition calling for its preservation was signed by over 1000 residents. Grays native Russell Brand gave his support to saving the theatre on an Instagram post and pledged to perform a show there to help prevent its closure. In January 2022 Thurrock Council announced that they supported a counter proposal that will see the theatre remain open under community ownership. A group dedicated to saving the theatre began negotiating with the council, and had to provide it with an affordable business plan for the theatre by 13 July 2022. However, after an unnamed organisation expressed interest in buying the theatre, the council has delayed the deadline to September to allow it to put forward an alternative business plan.

Its economy is linked to Port of London industries, its own offices, retail and Lakeside, West Thurrock. Its variously used riverside (from homes through wild bird-habitat marshland to importation, storage and distribution) faces Broadness Lighthouse in Kent.

Education

Primary education 
Primary schools in Grays include:

 Quarry Hill Academy (formerly Quarry Hill Primary and Pre School)
 West Thurrock Academy (formerly West Thurrock Primary School)
 Belmont Castle Academy (formerly Stifford Primary School)
 Woodside Academy (formerly Woodside Primary School)
 Warren Primary School
 Thameside Primary School
 Deneholm Primary School
 St Thomas of Canterbury Catholic Primary School 
 Gateway Primary Free School

Quarry Hill Primary and Pre School and Thameside Primary School were formed from the amalgamations of failing infant and junior schools. Since then, both schools have received favourable grades from education watchdog Ofsted. Belmont Castle Academy was renamed in honour of Belmont Castle, a demolished gothic mansion that was located on the school site. The Gateway Primary Free School is situated on the site of Gateway Academy, and is the only primary school with free school status in Grays.

Secondary education 
Secondary schools in Grays include:

 Hathaway Academy (formerly the Grays School Media Arts College)
 Gateway Academy (formerly the Gateway Community College)
 Grays Convent High School (formerly the Convent Day School)
 William Edwards School (formerly William Edwards School and Sports College)
 Thames Park Secondary School
 Orsett Heath Academy

Since 2007, all of these schools have had specialist school status. Gateway Academy and Hathaway Academy have specialisms in the arts. In the case of Hathaway Academy, these include digital media and the performing arts. Gateway Academy also specialises in design and engineering. William Edwards School and Orsett Heath Academy share a sports specialism, with both schools utilising the ability to admit 10% of their intake by academic aptitude in this subject, an ability granted to all sport specialist schools. Grays Convent High School maintains a language specialism and Thames Park Secondary School has specialisms in artificial intelligence and digital technology.

Gateway Academy was formed in 2003 from a fresh start merger of Torells School in Grays and St Chad's School in Tilbury. The Torells School site has since been demolished and replaced by the sites of two special schools, Treetops School and Treetops Free School. Comedian Joe Pasquale and Olympic medallist Fatima Whitbread both attended Torells School. Footballers Chris Cohen and Max Porter went to William Edwards School. Actor, Youtuber and comedian Russell Brand attended the Grays School, making his acting debut at one of the school's Bugsy Malone productions. Grays Convent High School was attended by journalist and former Thurrock MP candidate Polly Billington and runner Jessica Judd.

All of these schools are coeducational academies or free schools, with the exception of Grays Convent High School, which is instead a voluntary aided Catholic school for girls.

Further education 
A sixth form was operated by Gateway Academy before 2014, but it closed that year. In 2011, Ofsted deemed the sixth form as satisfactory, which meant it required improvement. This was primarily because of concerns over the number of students dropping out, which was above average. Hathaway Academy intended to open a sixth form some time before the 2014/2015 academic year, but this never came to fruition.

Thurrock Technical College opened in 1952 on Dell Road. Between 1954 and 1957 the college was based in parts of the site of Grays County Technical High School (which would become Grays School) and Grays Hall. In 1960 it reopened on Woodview Road, later establishing a second campus in Aveley. The college later merged with Basildon College to form Thurrock and Basildon College, with the Woodview Campus remaining in operation. The college then amalgamated with South East Essex College of Arts and Technology in 2010, forming South Essex College. The Thurrock Campus relocated from Woodview Road to a new complex in Grays town centre in September 2014.

The local sixth form college is USP College Palmer's Campus. Palmer's dates back to 1706, when the merchant William Palmer founded a charity school for "ten poore children" of the parish of Grays Essex. The school was located in the local churchyard and evolved into a boys' school. In response to the enactment of the Elementary Education Act 1870, the school reopened on a new site on the hill above the town in 1874. A girl's school opened on the site in 1876. Both schools were grammar schools, operating on the same site until 1931, when the girls' school relocated to Chadwell Road. From this time, Palmer's became a public school. This meant that students were no longer admitted on academic performance regardless of background and were instead admitted by fee. This was reversed in 1944, however wealthier students were still prioritised, even if they failed the 11+ exam required for enrolment. In 1971 the girls' school began its conversion into a sixth form college, reopening as Palmer's College in 1972 after it amalgamated with the boys' school and Aveley County Technical High School. The college merged with Seevic College in August 2017, forming USP College.

There is also Thurrock Adult Community College which is located in multiple venues and community hubs across Thurrock and used to be based from Richmond Road in Grays.

Transport
Grays has good road links, being close to the A13 road and the M25 motorway. The A126 London Road is the main road which links Grays town centre with Lakeside Shopping Centre, Purfleet and Tilbury.

Grays railway station runs through the centre of the built-up core and is served by c2c services to London Fenchurch Street to the west and Shoeburyness to the east.

Also Grays bus station by the station above is a hub for most bus services in Thurrock. The bus services are operated by Ensignbus, First Essex and NIBS Buses.

Sports
The area's local football team is Grays Athletic, previously based in Grays but now in nearby Aveley, which plays non-League football and has won the FA Trophy twice.

Notable people

Actors and authors 

 Ian Abercrombie, actor and comedian.
 Joe Pasquale, comedian, actor and television presenter.
 Michelle Harrison, author.
 Phil Davis,  actor, author, director and narrator.
 Russell Brand, comedian, actor, author, radio host and YouTuber.

Athletes 
Adam Newton, retired footballer.
Charlie Whitchurch, retired footballer.
Chris Cohen, retired footballer and coach.
Fatima Whitbread, retired Olympic medallist javelin thrower.
Jessica Judd, runner.
Max Porter, retired footballer and coach.
Stuart Barnes, retired rugby union footballer and commentator.
William Kennedy, retired footballer and soldier.

Politicians and nobility 
Frederick Marshall, Australian Labor politician.
Polly Billington, Labour politician and journalist.
Sir Henry de Grey, courtier of King John of England.
Sir John de Grey, soldier and high sheriff.

Singers 
Louisa Johnson, singer and X Factor series 12 winner.
Sara Flower, contralto singer.

Other 
Alfred Russel Wallace, discovered evolution through natural selection.
Elisabeth Vellacott, painter.
Lewis Daynes, murderer of Breck Bednar.
Philip Vellacott, scholar.

Notes

References

Further reading
Evans, Brian. Grays Thurrock, A History, Phillimore, 2004, .

External links
Bygone Grays Thurrock – Local history website

 
Towns in Essex
Populated places on the River Thames
Port of London
Beaches of Essex
Former civil parishes in Essex
Thurrock